Perissos is a station on Athens Metro Line 1 in Nea Ionia, Athens. It is 16.556 km from Piraeus.  The station is founded by the limits of Nea Ionia and is named after the neighbourhood of Perissos. It was first opened on 14 March 1956 and was renovated in 2004. It features two platforms.

The station features escalators and lifts for the disabled.

References

Athens Metro stations
Railway stations opened in 1956
1956 establishments in Greece